Kostino is a rural locality (a village) in Razinskoye Rural Settlement, Kharovsky District, Vologda Oblast, Russia. The population was 13 as of 2002.

Geography 
Kostino is located 36 km north of Kharovsk (the district's administrative centre) by road. Lapikha is the nearest rural locality.

References 

Rural localities in Kharovsky District